"If You Could See Me Now" is a 1946 jazz standard, composed by Tadd Dameron. He wrote it especially for vocalist Sarah Vaughan, a frequent collaborator. Lyrics were written by Carl Sigman and it became one of her signature songs, inducted into the Grammy Hall of Fame in 1998. Dameron himself included a version, sung by Barbara Winfield, on his 1962 album The Magic Touch.

Notable recordings 
Sarah Vaughan's 1946 original recording was released through Musicraft Records. It also appeared on her 1981 album Send in the Clowns with the Count Basie Orchestra.
Randy Weston recorded the composition in 1956/57 for his album Trio and Solo
Gil Evans recorded a version for his 1957 album Gil Evans & Ten
Chet Baker recorded it for his 1959 album Chet.
Yusef Lateef recorded it on his 1959 album Cry! - Tender
Bobby Timmons from his album Easy Does It (1961)
Milt Jackson recorded it on his 1962 Big Bags album
Bill Evans recorded his version of the song for his 1962 album Moon Beams and also on his Trio '65 album
Sheila Jordan recorded it on her 1963 debut album Portrait of Sheila 
Junior Cook recorded it on the 1963 Roy Brooks album Beat
Red Garland recorded a quintet version that appeared on his Soul Burnin' album, released in 1964  
Wynton Kelly recorded a trio version that appeared on his 1965 album Undiluted  
Wes Montgomery on the live album Smokin' at the Half Note (1965)
Dexter Gordon recorded it on his 1970 album The Jumpin' Blues
Kenny Drew recorded a version on his 1974 album If You Could See Me Now
Barry Harris recorded it on his 1975 Barry Harris Plays Tadd Dameron album
Tsuyoshi Yamamoto on Life (1976)
Oscar Peterson – The Oscar Peterson Four with Joe Pass recorded it in 1983 on the album If You Could See Me Now
Etta Jones recorded the song for her 1978 album If You Could See Me Now
John Abercrombie and John Scofield included the song in their 1984 album Solar.
Jaco Pastorius covered the song in 1985 during a televised concert in Belgium.
Jacky Terrasson and Tom Harrell included the song in their 1991 Moon and Sand album.
Mel Tormé recorded a notable version in 1995 with Canadian trombonist and bandleader Rob McConnell.
Buddy DeFranco from his 1992 album Chip off the Old Bop and 1997 Dave McKenna album You Must Believe in Swing
Joe Lovano included it in his 2000 album 52nd Street Themes.
Eliane Elias included the song in her 2010 album Eliane Elias Plays Live.

References

1940s jazz standards
1946 songs
1946 debut singles
Songs written by Carl Sigman
Songs with music by Tadd Dameron